Aphnaeus affinis is a butterfly in the family Lycaenidae. It is found in the Democratic Republic of Congo (Lualaba and Shaba) and northern Zambia.

References

Butterflies described in 1921
Aphnaeus